The Apollo Conference is a high school athletic conference represented by 7 schools in the central portion of Illinois. It is a member of the Illinois High School Association.

The conference offers championships for girls in basketball, cross country, golf, softball, tennis, track & field, and volleyball. In boys' sports, the Apollo offers championships in baseball, basketball, cross country, football, golf, tennis, track & field, and wrestling.

History
The conference was formed in 1970 by charter members Charleston, Newton, Paris and Robinson who left from the Eastern Illinois Conference. In 1972 Decatur Lakeview and Mt. Zion joined the conference after departing the Cenois Conference. Effingham and Taylorville joined in 1981, leaving the Mid-State Conference. Lakeview closed in 1982, bringing the conference back to seven members. In 1993 Taylorville left to join the newly formed Central State 8 Conference. Olney and Salem joined from the North Egypt Conference, which was dissolved in 2003.
 
Significant changes have occurred for the Apollo Conference. Founding members Newton and Robinson, as well as Olney, left for the Little Illini Conference in the 2012–13 school year. Mattoon joined the league in that same school year, departing from the Big 12 Conference. Teutopolis was invited to join the conference, but declined the invitation. The Taylorville Tornadoes rejoined the conference in 2014, while another Apollo founding school, Paris, left for the Little Illini Conference. In 2015, Corn Belt Conference member Mahomet-Seymour was accepted into the conference starting with the 2017–2018 school year. Later in the same year, Central State Eight conference member Lincoln was accepted to join in 2017–2018. Shortly after, Salem elected to join the Cahokia Conference in 2017–18. In 2023, Lincoln will leave the conference and head back to their previous league, The Central State Eight.
 
Geographical concerns and school enrollment has played a part in the switching between Apollo and Little Illini Conferences. Charleston is the only founding member of the conference to stay in the Apollo, while Newton, Paris and Robinson have moved into the LIC

Current members

Former members

Membership timeline

See also
 List of Illinois High School Association member conferences

References

External links
 Apollo Conference official website
 Illinois High School Association (IHSA) official website
 IHSA Apollo Conference football standings
 Apollo Football Conference. IllinoisPigskin.com (Illinois Pigskin: Fan Focused Coverage of Illinois High School Football)
 Charleston High School
 Effingham High School
 Lincoln High School
 Mahomet-Seymour High School
 Mattoon High School
 Mount Zion High School
 Taylorville High School

Illinois high school sports conferences
Education in Champaign County, Illinois
Education in Coles County, Illinois
Education in Crawford County, Illinois
Education in Effingham County, Illinois
Education in Logan County, Illinois
Education in Macon County, Illinois